Michael Gann (born October 19, 1963 in Stillwater, Oklahoma) is a former defensive lineman who played nine seasons in the NFL for the Atlanta Falcons. He scored a touchdown as a rookie on a lateral from teammate Rick Bryan in a win over New Orleans.

References

1963 births
Living people
American football defensive ends
Notre Dame Fighting Irish football players
Atlanta Falcons players
People from Stillwater, Oklahoma
Ed Block Courage Award recipients